The 2020 Super Rugby Aotearoa season (branded as Investec Super Rugby Aotearoa for sponsorship reasons) was a domestic club rugby union tournament organised by New Zealand Rugby. It was a 10-week, round robin tournament played between the five New Zealand-based teams of Super Rugby. The competition supplanted the 2020 Super Rugby season, which was suspended in March due to the COVID-19 pandemic.

Announced on 6 May, the competition ran from 13 June to 14 August, making it the first professional rugby union competition to occur since the beginning of the pandemic. On 8 June, with most non-travel restrictions relating to the pandemic having been lifted in New Zealand (Alert Level 1), it was announced that the matches would be played with spectators admitted, making it among the first professional sporting events not played behind closed doors since the beginning of the pandemic's global spread.

Due to the reinstatement of restrictions nationally on 11 August after new cases of community transmission, one match in the final round was played behind closed doors, and the other was cancelled due to Alert Level 3 in Auckland and declared a 0-0 draw — resulting in the Crusaders clinching the tournament championship.

With New Zealand border restrictions and managed isolation requirements not easing despite the country back in level 1 alert level as of October 11, 2020, Super Rugby Aotearoa and Australia will return in 2021, and Super Rugby Aotearoa will by sponsored by Sky New Zealand. There will be an increase of Sunday afternoon fixtures, which proved popular in 2020.

Law adaptions 
On 2 June, New Zealand Rugby announced that it would implement two optional law trials being offered by World Rugby, including a golden point format for extra time, and that players who receive a red card can be substituted after 20 minutes. It was also stated that referees would be stricter in applying laws for breakdowns to increase the pace of play.

Standings

Matches

Round 1

Round 2

Round 3

Round 4

Round 5

Round 6

Round 7

Round 8

Round 9

Round 10

On 14 August, due to restrictions being reintroduced nationwide after new cases of community transmission (with Alert Level 3 in effect in Auckland and thus prohibiting all events, and all other regions under Alert Level 2), the penultimate match between the Highlanders and Hurricanes was played behind closed doors, and the final match between the Blues and Crusaders was cancelled and declared a draw (with both teams awarded two points on the final standings).

Players

Squads

See also

Super Rugby
Super Rugby Aotearoa
Super Rugby AU
Super Rugby Unlocked
2020 North vs South rugby union match

References

External links
 

2020 Super Rugby season
2020 in New Zealand rugby union
2020 rugby union tournaments for clubs